Pornofilmy is a Russian punk band from the city of Dubna and one of the most popular existing rock bands in Russia. It was founded in 2008. The members of the band include lead vocalist and poet Vladimir Kotlyarov, solo guitarist Vyacheslav Seleznev, rhythm guitarist and band manager Alexander Rusakov, drummer Kirill Muravyov and bassist Alexander Agafonov.

The band stands out from other Russian punk-rock bands for its highly politicized lyrics and propaganda of healthy lifestyle. All members of the band are vegetarians and do not drink alcohol, use drugs or smoke. The band was popular in Dubna in the early years of its existence, but after the release of its fourth album "In the Range Between Despair and Hope" and the cancellation of a number of concerts by local authorities, it gained national fame and became one of the leading performers of rock music in Russia. Currently, Pornofilmy has 13 releases, including 8 studio albums and 5 mini-albums. The last studio album, "It Shall Pass" was released in January 2020.

Name 
According to band leader Vladimir Kotlyarov, the name of the band is a metaphor for the surrounding reality. The name of the band was invented in our garage - I wanted the word to catch, excite, and outrage. I heard it on some crime chronicle on the TV: they said that an underground workshop for the production of porn movies was liquidated. It seemed to me that this word was stupid, but cool for the name of the band. Over time, for many people this word became a proper name and lost its original meaning. Although there are still restrictions - for example, we will not be invited to the TV. But we are not torn: we still remain underground

History

Origins 
The band was founded in 2008, but the musicians began to actively develop the band only in 2012, after all the participants abandoned alcohol, smoking and other bad habits, which became the main theme of most of the band's lyrics at that time. The members of the band recorded all their music in their garage and initially mixed music themselves, but then a friend of the band got engaged in mastering for payment.

The band started gradually getting more and more attention in Russia, but it wasn't always positive. The first song "Come!" from the album “Russian Dream. Part I”of 2015 is dedicated to a fan of the band who committed suicide by throwing himself from the roof of his house due to a lack of understanding and support in his environment. His mother later wrote a letter to the band asking them to write a song telling their young fans to never abandon hope for life, so that no one repeats her son's fate.

Growth of popularity 
The band's popularity grew immensely after the realize of two albums - "In the Range Between Despair and Hope" in 2018 and "It shall pass" in 2020. They gave a performance in 2020 in Moscow's "adrenalin" stadium and St. Petersburg's Ice palace stadium, as well as on Russia's national TV on the Evening Urgant talk show.

Charity 
The band often performs at charity concerts.

In mid-2017, the bandlaunched a crowdfunding project on the Planeta.ru website, where they announced the recording of a new album, adding  that all the money raised would go not to the recording, but to the charitable foundation "Fund Against Leukemia". Out of the requested 550,000 rubles. the band raised 909,101 rubles. For the same foundation the band held an online acoustic concert where they collected additional money. In addition, they personally came to the foundation and distributed clothes, food and other goods for those in need.

In May 2018, the band visited children's oncological center, where they held a music master class, and also taught the children about the basics of building melodies.

On April 1, 2020, the vocalist of the band Vladimir Kotlyarov played a third charity acoustic online concert in support of the Fund for the Fight Against Leukemia, which again raised over 950,000 rubles. Additionally, on the YouTube channel, regular users donated additional 855,000 rubles. The whole sum was given to the fund the next morning.

Scandals 
The band has always been in scandals, mostly for their anti-government lyrics as well as their name.

In Ulan-Ude, posters with the name of the band were hung around the city. Local residents decided that it was an advertisement for pornography, and began to write complaints.

In December 2016, in the city of Volgograd, the band's concert was canceled at the urgent request of the Volgograd Region Prosecutor's Office.

In October 2017, at the request of the federal security service and the city authorities, two concerts of the band were canceled in the Vladimir region, in the city of Murom, and in the Nizhny Novgorod region, in the city of Vyksa. Initially, the concert of the band was planned to take place on October 21 in the city of Murom in the "Art Bar 111" club. But the owner of the club, Tatyana Makurina, phoned Anna Shishkina, chairman of the Muroma Committee for the Development of the Consumer Market, and demanded that the band's concert be canceled because of the propaganda of extremism and fascism. Later, Makurina was summoned to the prosecutor's office, where the prosecutor and the FSB explained that "the Pornofilmy band will not perform in the Vladimir region because they are extremists". The city administration also threatened the band:We didn't want to cancel the concert, but we received a call from the Murom administration. We were told: “You see, Murom is a small city. Anything can happen with you, your business and your family. ” They threatened that they would close my business, I will not be able to work and live in Murom.After the concert was moved to the neighboring town of Vyksa, the band was still unable to give a performance. According to the band's guitarist Alexander Rusakov, the club owners refused to hold the concert due to "phone threats about the possible closure of the establishment" and it was not the first time when the authorities in the Vladimir region wiished to ban the concert of the band. As a result, the band's vocalist conducted an online broadcast of the band's acoustic concert on VKontakte.

On July 23, 2018, half a month before the start of the Nashestvie festival, the band announced on its pages in social networks that it would not perform at the festival due to the propaganda of militarism. "No propaganda of militarism - this was our main condition for participation in the festival". Following Pornofilmy, in the next few days bands like "Elysium", "Yorsh", "Distemper", "Poshlaya Molli" and the singer Monetochka refused to participate in the festival for the same reason. For several years now, the Nashestvie festival has been held with the support of the Ministry of Defense of the Russian Federation, but in 2018 the organizers announced that the Ministry of Defense would not participate and a number of bands agreed to perform at the festival. Two weeks prior the organizers informed the bands that the RF Ministry of Defense would appear at Invasion this year as well, and for this reason many artists refused to perform.

In January 2020, the FAS department in the Ulyanovsk region opened a case due to the advertising of the band's concert. According to a local resident who wrote a complaint, "the ad's name for an adult film band, without specifying the punk rock band itself, is misleading consumers".

On March 11, 2020, in the city of Chelyabinsk, the Galaktika Club refused to hold a concert of the band, citing a letter from the police in which it was said that the band's songs “contain obscene language, information encouraging children to take actions that pose a threat to life and health, calls drug use, denial of family values, disrespect for parents".

Discography

Studio albums 
Glue! (2010)
Boring Life (2012)
Karma of the workers
Poor country (2013)
Youth and Punk Rock (2014)
Russian Dream. Part I (2015)
Russian Dream. Part II (2016)
In the Range Between Despair and Hope (2017) 
It Shall Pass (2020)

Mini albums 
You are in my sect (2011)
Art (2012)
How many bombs will go off? (2012)
On all screens of the country (2012)
White Flakes (2014)
Resistance (2015)
Like the last time (2016)

Singles 
"Our Names" (feat Lumen) (2015)
"I'm so afraid" (2018)
"Rituals" (2019)

References 

Russian punk rock groups
Musical groups established in 2008